Marc Gold  (born June 30, 1950) is Canadian law professor and politician who has served as Representative of the Government in the Senate since 2020. Gold has sat as the senator for Stadacona, Quebec since he was appointed on the advice of Prime Minister Justin Trudeau in 2016. He was a member of the Independent Senators Group (ISG) caucus from 2016 to 2020 but now sits as an Independent. Prior to his appointment as a senator, Gold taught law and was appointed associate dean at Osgoode Hall Law School.

Early life and education 
Gold is the son of Alan B. Gold, who was chief justice of Quebec Superior Court. Gold is Jewish.

He earned his undergraduate degree at McGill University in 1972, and an LL.B from the University of British Columbia in 1978 with top honours as the Gold Medalist. Recipient of the Viscount Bennett Scholarship by the Canadian Bar Association, he received his LL.M from the Harvard Law School in 1979. Gold is a member of the Barreau du Québec and of the Law Society of Ontario, and has completed mediation training at the Harvard Law School Program on Negotiation.

Career 
Gold was previously a law professor at Osgoode Hall Law School in Toronto for 12 years, ultimately serving as associate dean, and also provided training for federally-appointed judges in the area of constitutional law and the Canadian Charter of Rights and Freedoms. More recently, he has been adjunct professor of law at McGill University.

He has been involved in Jewish community life as chair of the Jewish Federations of Canada, a member of the Board of Governors of the Jewish Agency for Israel, and is a former chairperson of the Canada-Israel Committee. He served for ten years as the chair of ENSEMBLE pour le respect de la diversité (formerly the Tolerance Foundation), a not-for-profit organization that works with youth to build a more open and inclusive society. At the time of his appointment to the Senate he was a part-time member of the Parole Board of Canada.

In the early 1990s he returned to Montreal to become vice-president of Maxwell Cummings and Sons, a family-owned private real estate and investment firm based in Montreal, a position he held for 23 years.

Political career 
Gold's appointment was announced on November 2, 2016, by Prime Minister Justin Trudeau. He assumed office on November 25, 2016, and was sworn as a Senator on December 2, 2016.

He was named Representative of the Government in the Senate on January 24, 2020.

References

External links

1950 births
Anglophone Quebec people
Jewish Canadian politicians
Canadian legal scholars
Canadian senators from Quebec
Canadian Zionists
Harvard Law School alumni
Lawyers from Montreal
Living people
Academic staff of McGill University
Academic staff of the Osgoode Hall Law School
Politicians from Montreal
21st-century Canadian politicians
Independent Senators Group
Members of the King's Privy Council for Canada